Bury the Hatchet is the fourth studio album by Irish alternative rock band the Cranberries, released on 19 April 1999. In the US, the album had shipped 500,000 copies as of 2 June 1999, and received a gold certification.

The album is the first album released by the band after their first hiatus, which began in September 1996. Dolores O'Riordan had taken that time to heal from stress-induced diseases, and also had her first child, Taylor, during this period. This last fact influenced some of the tracks on the album, most notably "Animal Instinct" and "You and Me".

The themes of the songs vary from maternity and children to divorce and child abuse.

Album cover

The album cover, which was designed by Storm Thorgerson, depicts a naked man being watched by a giant eye in a barren landscape. The picture was taken in Oljato-Monument Valley, Arizona, and was later featured on Pitchforks list of "The Worst Record Covers of All Time", which stated "Storm Thorgerson's artwork fluctuates between the iconic and the inane. This one falls into the latter category." Thorgerson also designed the cover for their 2001 album Wake Up and Smell the Coffee. The vinyl edition's cover is different, with the nude man and the giant eye in a desert setting (with colouring and lighting adjusted appropriately), but the original cover pictures are used on the record labels. The back cover shows the man turned around, shouting at the eye.

Track listing

CD

Vinyl
The vinyl version features a different track order (this is retained on the 2015 reissue).

Personnel
The Cranberries
 Dolores O'Riordan – vocals, guitar, keyboards
 Noel Hogan – acoustic and electric guitars
 Mike Hogan – bass guitar
 Fergal Lawler – drums, percussion

Charts

Weekly charts

Year-end charts

Certifications and sales

References

The Cranberries albums
1999 albums
Albums with cover art by Storm Thorgerson
Island Records albums
Jangle pop albums